Abu Chenari (also Romanized as Abū Chenārī) is a village in Joghatai Rural District, in the Central District of Joghatai County, Razavi Khorasan Province, Iran. At the 2006 census, its population was 1,352, in 308 families.

See also 

 List of cities, towns and villages in Razavi Khorasan Province

References 

Populated places in Joghatai County